Belmont Township may refer to:

 Belmont Township, Iroquois County, Illinois
 Belmont Township, Warren County, Iowa
 Belmont Township, Kingman County, Kansas
 Belmont Township, Phillips County, Kansas, in Phillips County, Kansas
 Belmont Township, Jackson County, Minnesota
 Belmont Township, Douglas County, South Dakota, in Douglas County, South Dakota
 Belmont Township, Spink County, South Dakota, in Spink County, South Dakota

Township name disambiguation pages